Men's Slalom World Cup 1967/1968

Calendar

Note: Round 3/Race 9 was the Olympic event, which counts also for the World Cup. See also 1968 Winter Olympics and Alpine skiing at the 1968 Winter Olympics

Final point standings
Points were only awarded for top ten finishes (see scoring system).

References
 fis-ski.com

Men's slalom
FIS Alpine Ski World Cup slalom men's discipline titles